Wayangankar is an Indian surname. Notable people with the surname include:

Srinivas Wayangankar (born 1946), Indian cricketer
Tejaswi Prakash Wayangankar (born 1992), Indian television actress.

Indian surnames